The Argentine National Gendarmerie (GNA) is the national gendarmerie force and corps of border guards of the Argentine Republic. It has a strength of 70,000.

The gendarmerie is primarily a frontier guard force but also fulfils other important roles. The force functions from what are today five regional headquarters at Campo de Mayo, Córdoba, Rosario, San Miguel de Tucumán and Bahía Blanca.

Personnel and training
Non-commissioned personnel of the gendarmerie are all volunteers and receive their training in the force's own comprehensive system of training institutions. Officers graduate after a three-year course at the National Gendarmerie Academy. Both officers and non-commissioned personnel have access to the specialist training establishments of the Army.

History

The gendarmerie was created in 1938 by the National Congress, and replaced the regiments of the Army which previously fulfilled the gendarmerie's missions. The gendarmerie was particularly tasked with providing security in isolated and sparsely populated frontier regions which had only been settled relatively recently. In many senses the gendarmerie may still be considered an adjunct of the Argentine Army.

Activities
The gendarmerie's mission and functions are concerned with both domestic security and national defense. According to Laws No. 23.554 and 24.059, the armed forces cannot intervene in internal civil conflicts, except in logistics’ and support roles, so the gendarmerie is subordinate to the Ministry of Security. It is defined as a civilian "security force of a military nature". It maintains a functional relationship with the minister of defense, as part of both the National Defense System and the Interior Security System. It therefore maintains capabilities arising from the demands required by joint military planning with the armed forces.

The gendarmerie's main missions are:
Providing security for Argentina's borders
Providing security for places of national strategic importance (e.g. nuclear plants)

The gendarmerie is also used for other security missions, which include:

Policing missions:
Assisting provincial police services in maintaining public security in rural areas
Preventing smuggling
Fighting drug trafficking
Fighting terrorism
Fighting crimes "against life and freedom" (children and organs trade, slavery, etc.)
Dealing with economic crime
Dealing with environmental crime
Dealing with illegal immigration
Military missions:
War-fighting missions (e.g. in the Falklands War)
Peacekeeping or humanitarian aid missions under the United Nations
Providing security for Argentine embassies and consulates in several foreign nations

Under the United Nations, the Gendarmerie has served in Guatemala, Bosnia and Herzegovina, Croatia, Angola, Lebanon, Rwanda, Liberia, Cyprus, South Sudan, Haiti and Colombia.

Organization

High command
The high command includes:

The national director: As of 2021, the national director is Commandant-General Andrés Severino.
The deputy national director: As of 2021, the deputy national director is Commandant-General Javier Alberto Lapalma.
The General and Special Staff of the National Directorate of the Gendarmerie.

Rank structure
The ranks of the Argentine Gendarmerie, in ascending order, are:
Sub-Officer Ranks

The ranks up to and including sergeant are classified as Subaltern Sub-Officers (Suboficiales Subalternos), and the remainder are classified as Superior Sub-Officers (Suboficiales Superiores). The sub-officer ranks are the same as Argentine army ranks, and wear the same insignia, but with a much thicker gold band for a Gendarmerie Principal Sub-Officer than is used in the Army.

Officer Ranks

The ranks up to and including Segundo Comandante are classified as Subaltern Officers (Oficiales Subalternos). Gendarmerie officers wear the same insignia as the equivalent  Argentine Army rank. The National Director and his Deputy wear the insignia of an Argentine Lieutenant-General and Divisional General respectively, although they still have the rank of Commandant-General. (NB: Lieutenant-General is the highest Argentine Army rank.)

Unit structure
A Section (Spanish: pelotón) is a squad of several men.
A Group (Spanish: grupo) consists of several sections and is the basic operational unit of the Gendarmerie.
A Squadron (Spanish: escuadrón) consists of three groups.
A Grouping (Spanish: agrupación) consists of several squadrons. This may be thought of as roughly corresponding to the level of command of a battalion or regiment.
Above the groupings are the regional commands and the staff of the National Directorate.

Operational units
Regional Headquarters
Mobile Units
Special Forces Units: Grupo Alacrán
Intelligence Squadron
Highway Security Sections
Environment Protection Service
Mountain Rescue Groups
Scrubland Special Section: Grupo MONTE

Support units
Logistics Squadron
Telecommunications and Computer Service
Expert Investigation Service
Aviation Service
Medical Assistance Service

Equipment

Firearms

Vehicles

Aircraft 
The service has a small inventory of aircraft, based at Campo de Mayo.
 Eurocopter EC135
 Eurocopter AS350 Ecureuil
 Pilatus PC-12/47E
 Pilatus PC-6B/H2
 AgustaWestland AW119 Koala
 AgustaWestland AW169

See also
Laguna del Desierto incident
Foreign relations of Argentina
Argentine Naval Prefecture
Argentine Federal Police

References

External links

 

National Gendarmerie
Gendarmerie
Border guards
Federal law enforcement agencies of Argentina